"Over and Over" is a song written by Robert James Byrd and recorded by him using the stage name Bobby Day. Day's version entered the Billboard Hot 100 in 1958, the same week a version of the same song by Thurston Harris entered the chart.  Day's version reached #41, and was the B-side to "Rockin' Robin". Thurston Harris' version peaked at #96. In the song, the singer describes going to a party with misgivings of having a good time, until he sees a pretty girl. The singer attempts to ask her out, but she is waiting for her date to arrive. He vows to try "over and over".

Dave Clark Five version
In 1965, the most successful version was recorded by the Dave Clark Five, one of the early British Invasion bands of the mid-1960s. This version was sung by lead singer and keyboardist Mike Smith.   It followed the group's signature sound of thumping,  drum beats accompanied by a wailing saxophone. It omits the final verse of the song. In the US, "Over and Over" was the group's 12th Top 40 hit and was their  only #1 hit.  It was also the last #1 hit of 1965. Despite its success in the United States and the popularity of the group on both sides of the Atlantic, the single only reached number 45 in the band's native United Kingdom. The DC5 also had only one UK number 1, Glad All Over, whilst this was their only US chart-topper. The Dave Clark Five omitted Bobby Day's last verse to the song, while the line "everybody went stag" as originally written by Bobby Byrd (Day's real name) was sung as “everybody there was there” on the DC5 version.

Cash Box described it as a "lively, hard-driving rendition" with "a danceable, pulsating beat."

Covers
In 1981, Mike Love of The Beach Boys covered the song on his solo album Looking Back With Love. Love recorded it again on his 2019 album 12 Sides of Summer.

References

1965 singles
The Dave Clark Five songs
Billboard Hot 100 number-one singles
Cashbox number-one singles
RPM Top Singles number-one singles
Songs written by Bobby Day
1958 songs